Oscar Dragon (born March 2, 1950) is a former American football running back. He played for the San Diego Chargers in 1972.

References

1950 births
Living people
American football running backs
Arizona State Sun Devils football players
San Diego Chargers players